M1 (M Egy) is a Hungarian  television channel owned and operated by Duna Média since 2015. It is also transmitted in high definition. It was the most watched national channel in Hungary and its transmission receiving is 97%. On 15 March 2015, M1 was relaunched as a 24-hour news channel, meaning all variety programming is now transferred to Duna.

A 2019 report by the European Federation of Journalists stated that news coverage of Hungarian public broadcaster is not balanced, opposition politicians' viewpoints are nearly absent from the reports, and there is a lack of transparency over the funding and work of MTVA. The report concluded that the "public service media have been deformed into state media."

On 15th March 2020, M1 had an overhaul; the gaps were removed from the circle, and a new graphics presentation was unveiled. The on-screen bug was changed from upper left corner to left down corner on the screen.

History

Beginning 
In addition to the continuous expansion and development of radio broadcasting, by the 1950s there was also the need to localize the TV stations that were spreading in the West. The first test broadcast was broadcast on 15 December 1953 from the Gyáli út postal experiment station. The second trial took place in June 1955 at the Hungarian Post Experimental Institute on Szabadság Hill, next to the former Hargita hostel. And in 1955, the first 60-meter Széchenyi Hill tower was built. It started its actual operation on 23 February 1957, but it officially began its operation with the mediation of the 1st May Labor Day ceremony. The regular television broadcasting only started in 1958 until then, the transmission towers only operated in test mode. However, to cover the entire country, it was necessary to build new transmitters, so the backbone transmitter network was created, and repeater stations were built across the country.

The first color television broadcast took place in 1969. In the 1970s and 1980s, the transmitter network was further expanded. In the beginning, it was broadcast only a few days a week, not at all on Long Monday. The exception was the broadcast of an event that aroused national interest, such as Bertalan Farkas' space travel in 1980. Here, the launch of the spaceship took place on Monday. It has been broadcast every day of the week since 1989.

Enlargement and social media 
The M2 channel began broadcasting in 1971. In the beginning, it supplemented and repeated the program structure of M1, from the beginning of the 2000s it was a cultural and informative channel, and since 2012 it has been gradually transformed and operates as a children's channel. On 15 March 2015, a new channel was launched in the evening section of the M2 children's channel as part of the Petőfi brand, and with this, the M2 channel was transformed under the name M2 Petőfi.

In 2009, he launched his internet mainly informational channel, called webm3, which was short-lived, the third station, M3, actually broadcasts only from December 20, 2013, but with a different theme than its online predecessor, because here it is mainly the 30-year-old archive content is the main role. The channel ceased operations on May 1, 2019, and is currently broadcast online.

On 18 July 2015, the fourth thematic channel dealing with sports, called M4 Sport, was launched, on which, in addition to the most important sports events, the 16 prominent Hungarian sports also play a major role.

M5 was launched on 1 August 2016 and has been broadcasting informative, educational, and cultural content since 18 September.

Collaborating MTVA and Converting 
Since 1 January 2011, it has been part of the media programs of the Media Support and Asset Management Fund (MTVA).

From 27 July 2012, the entire MTVA and thus the channel changed its image and logo, along with the Hungarian Broadcasting Office, its partner channels (M2, Duna, Duna World), and the radios belonging to the Media Service Support and Management Fund. In addition, the channel received new channel voices, one by Gerda Pikali and the other by Zoltán Rátóti.

On 15 March 2015, the channel was converted into a news channel, and the channel voices were János Csernák and Márta Herczegh. The previous programs were transferred to Duna after it became the main national channel. From that day on, MTV Híradó, Reggeli, and the weather forecast were also renewed.

On 15 March 2020, the identity of the M1 was renewed again at 05:55 and the on-screen logo was moved from the upper left corner to the lower left corner.

Programming

Noon program block
During 1994-1997 there was a noon program block from 12:00 to 15:30 CET. It was first program with clock before it. Entertainment programmes were broadcast without advertisements.

School programmes
During 1971-1989 there were school programmes in daytime. This made the startup come at 8am instead of 6pm. During weekends, summer and winter they started at 6pm with m2.

In 1989, school programming was replaced with morning programmes broadcast between 5:40am and 9:00am. They closed at 11:00-15:30. Later there was the information program at 11:00-12:00 and noon program at 12:00-15:30. So the broadcast were from 5:40 to 23:25 or 2:00.

Notable shows
 Híradó, news programme
 Reggeli, breakfast programme
 Ablak
 Delta, science technology magazine
 Panorama, foreign affairs

Former shows
 A Hét, weekly affairs programme
 Budapest Híradó, regional news programme
 Délután!, entertainment afternoon program from 12:00 to 15:30 ran until 1997
 Kinevezés és kinevezése (Appointment and appointment), Hungary's first sitcom (broadcasting between 1984 and 1987), broadcasting on Wednesday night at 23:15 to 23:45
 Marslakók, an original Hungarian daily soap opera, UFOs From The Mars in English
 Mindent Vagy Semmit!, the Hungarian version of Jeopardy!
 Szerencsekerék, the Hungarian version of Wheel of Fortune
 Szomszédok, soap opera which ran until 30 December 1999

Controversies 
In 2019 a leaked audio recording made during the run-up to European Parliament elections showed a senior MTVA editor, Balazs Bende informing reporters that the institution does not favor the opposition's list and the reporters should work accordingly. Bende instructed the reporters to produce content using the "appropriate" narrative and methodology, especially on topics like Brussels and migrants.

See also
Eastern Bloc information dissemination

References

External links

mediaklikk.hu/m1
M1 presentation at TVARK

Eastern Bloc mass media
Television networks in Hungary
Television channels and stations established in 1957
1957 establishments in Hungary
Mass media in Budapest
MTVA (Hungary)
24-hour television news channels